Ben Pienaar (born 10 September 1986) is a rugby union player for London Welsh in the Aviva Premiership, having formerly played for Leicester Tigers in the Aviva Premiership. 

Born in South Africa, Pienaar previously played for Langley School, Loddon before moving to Gresham's School and for England Schools, 

He represented Norfolk from U-14s to U-16s, then was capped by England at U-16 and U-19 level. 

Outside rugby, Pienaar is also a past Junior National Champion at judo.

Following injury and suspension of the more established number eights at Tigers, Pienaar had an opportunity for a run in the first team earning the praise of the coaches in the process. Pienaar was added to Tigers Heineken Cup squad for the knock-out stages of the 2008–09 competition.

References

External links
Leicester profile

1986 births
Living people
South African rugby union players
Leicester Tigers players
Moseley Rugby Football Club players
People educated at Gresham's School
People educated at Langley School, Loddon
Rugby union players from the Free State (province)